Penny's Bay or Chok Ko Wan was a bay in north-eastern Lantau Island, and had been a port since the Ming dynasty. The bay has since been reclaimed and is the site of the Hong Kong Disneyland Resort, which consists of the Hong Kong Disneyland theme park, Disneyland Hotel, and Disney's Hollywood Hotel, and the Inspiration Lake. During the COVID-19 pandemic, it became home to Penny's Bay Quarantine Centre. It is connected by a highway and a rail connection on the MTR Disneyland Resort line to Sunny Bay station.

Penny's Bay is located in Tsuen Wan District, but a small southern portion falls in Islands District.

Dioxin contamination
Before the reclamation of the bay, Cheoy Lee Shipyard operated in the bay from 1964 to April 2001. The Government acquired the land from the owners for the sum of HK$1.48 billion, and paid HK$22.7 million in additional compensation, according to a Public Works Subcommittee paper from May 2002.

The Government had not realised that its operations accumulated  of soil contaminated with dioxin, heavy metals, and hydrocarbons. The solid waste was dug up and transferred to To Kau Wan on the north shore of Northeast Lantau for temporary processing, and finally incinerated at the Chemical Waste Treatment Centre on the Tsing Yi Island amid protests by residents. The total cleanup cost not taken into account at the time of acquisition was estimated at HK$450 million.

Penny's Bay Quarantine Centre (PBQC)

Penny's Bay Quarantine Centre (PBQC) has a total capacity of 1916 people. During the COVID-19 pandemic in Hong Kong, in 2021 it was used to house US arrivals to Hong Kong for one week as part of a mandatory quarantine applicable to travellers regardless of testing or vaccine status. In 2022, it was changed to a quarantine facility for mild-symptom cases.
Hong Kong's last remaining community isolation centre for Covid patients, Penny's Bay on Lantau, officially closed its doors on Wednesday (01.03.2023).

See also
 Tsing Chau Tsai Peninsula
 Penny's Bay Power Station
 Pa Tau Kwu
Hong Kong's last remaining community isolation centre for Covid patients, Penny's Bay on Lantau, officially closed its doors on Wednesday (01.03.2023).

References

External links

 Delineation of area of existing village Chok Ko Wan and Pa Tau Kwu (Ma Wan) for election of resident representative (2019 to 2022)
 一齣環保悲喜劇  – Friends of the Earth (HK)

 
Populated places in Hong Kong
Lantau Island
Tsuen Wan District
Bays of Hong Kong
COVID-19 pandemic in Hong Kong